"Justice, Inc." is the first pulp magazine story to feature The Avenger.  Written by Paul Ernst, it was published in the  September 1, 1939 issue of The Avenger magazine.

Publishing history
This novel was re-published under its original title by Paperback Library on June 1, 1972.

Summary
Richard Henry Benson, aggressive, dominating, cold-eyed, self-made millionaire adventurer, forces himself and family onto a Buffalo/Montreal private charter flight (his mother-in-law is dying). He goes to the washroom and his wife and daughter vanish. The other passengers deny having seen them. A frantic Benson is subdued and hospitalized with "brain fever" and head trauma. Recovering, his face and hair are white, his facial flesh paralyzed and malleable. 
Investigating, Benson meets pharmacist/chemist Fergus MacMurdie, who DID see Benson's family, and gigantic engineer Algernon Heathcote Smith (Smitty), who agree to assist him. Benson fights and overcomes Smitty using nerve pressure. Benson has a custom compact .22 caliber gun and light throwing knife (Mike & Ike), shoots to crease the top of the skull and render unconscious rather than kill, is a master of disguise, and prefers maneuvering enemies into their own traps over killing. THE PLOT: A gang kidnaps wealthy Buffalo residents, drops them from a plane over Lake Ontario, and holds them prisoner on an island, all to get control of a Buffalo company. The three of them end the scheme, but Benson's wife and child are not found alive. The three form Justice, Inc. to bring criminals to justice.

Comic adaptations

A DC Comics title called Justice Inc. began in issue #1 (May–June 1975) and ran to issue #4 (November–December 1975). This series adapted the eponymous novel and continued with original stories which featured the Avenger and which took place during the time the original Avenger novels were released. Jack Kirby provided the artwork for issues #2–4. 

A two-issue limited series published by DC Comics in 1989 under the same title featured the Avenger and his agents in an updated, contemporary setting several years after their retirement.

References

Pulp stories
DC Comics titles
Works originally published in The Avenger (magazine)
1939 American novels
Comics by Dennis O'Neil
Comics by Jack Kirby